Pepper v. United States, 562 U.S. 476 (2011), is a decision by the Supreme Court of the United States concerning whether a United States District Court properly handled the sentencing of a former methamphetamine dealer. He was originally sentenced to 24 months in prison, far shorter than what federal guidelines generally specify for crimes of that nature. Prosecutors appealed the case to the United States Court of Appeals for the Eighth Circuit, which remanded the case back to the United States District Court for the Northern District of Iowa, which affirmed the original sentence after testimony relating the defendant's rehabilitation. The case was appealed to the Eighth Circuit again, and was again remanded. A different District Court judge gave him a 65-month sentence. The defendant then brought the case back to the Eighth Circuit, which confirmed the later ruling, and to then to the Supreme Court. Sonia Sotomayor wrote the opinion of the court, which ruled in favor of the defendant.

See also 
 List of United States Supreme Court cases, volume 562

References

External links
 

United States Supreme Court cases
2011 in United States case law
United States Supreme Court cases of the Roberts Court